Cristian Nicolás Medina (born 1 June 2002) is an Argentine professional footballer who plays as a central midfielder for Boca Juniors.

Club career
Medina came through the youth ranks at Rayo de Malaver, before moving to Boca Juniors in November 2012. He remained in their youth system across the next eight years, with the midfielder notably scoring a rabona goal in an academy Superclásico versus River Plate in April 2018. Medina was promoted into the first-team in mid-2020, as he appeared on the substitute's bench six times under manager Miguel Ángel Russo. His senior debut would arrive on 14 February 2021 in the Copa de la Liga Profesional against Gimnasia y Esgrima, as he replaced Leonardo Jara with twenty minutes remaining at La Bombonera.

International career
Medina was part of Argentina's U15 squad that won the 2017 South American Championship under manager Diego Placente on home soil, as they defeated Brazil in the final. Two years later, Medina was selected by Pablo Aimar's U17s for the 2019 South American Championship in Peru and the 2019 FIFA World Cup in Brazil. He scored once, versus Paraguay, in seven matches as they won the former competition, prior to featuring three times at the latter; as they reached the round of sixteen.

Style of play
Medina is primarily a central midfielder, though is capable of playing in various positions across the midfield. He was dubbed the next Fernando Gago by some Argentine media.

Career statistics
.

Notes

Honours
Boca Juniors
Primera División: 2022
Copa Argentina: 2019–20
Copa de la Liga Profesional: 2020, 2022
Supercopa Argentina: 2022

Argentina U15
South American U-15 Championship: 2017

Argentina U17
South American U-17 Championship: 2019

References

External links

2002 births
Living people
People from Moreno Partido
Argentine footballers
Argentina youth international footballers
Association football midfielders
Argentine Primera División players
Boca Juniors footballers
Sportspeople from Buenos Aires Province